Spannocchi is an Italian surname. The surname also belonged to a prominent aristocratic family from Siena, Italy.

Tiburzo or Tiburcio Spannocchi (1541–1609), chief engineer to kings Philip II and III of Spain
Emil Spannocchi (1916–1992), Austrian military officer
Giovanni Bonaventura Spannocchi (1742–1832), Minister of Justice for Kingdom of Italy 1802–1805
Angelo Spannocchi (died 1614), Sienese jurist
Pandolfo Spannocchi (fl. 17th-century), expert in miniature writing and his grandson of the same name published a collection of poems in 1717

See also
Palazzo Spannocchi

Surnames of Italian origin